Chuah is a state constituency in Negeri Sembilan, Malaysia, that has been represented in the Negeri Sembilan State Legislative Assembly.

The state constituency was first contested in 2004 and is mandated to return a single Assemblyman to the Negeri Sembilan State Legislative Assembly under the first-past-the-post voting system. , the State Assemblyman for Chuah is Yek Diew Ching from the Parti Keadilan Rakyat (PKR), which is part of the state's ruling coalition, Pakatan Harapan (PH).

Definition 
The Chuah constituency contains the polling districts of Tanah Merah, Kampong Pachitan, Bukit Pelandok, Sungai Nipah and Chuah.

Demographics

Representation history

Election results

References

Negeri Sembilan state constituencies